The List of Tamil Proverbs consists of some of the commonly used by Tamil people and their diaspora all over the world. There were thousands and thousands of proverbs were used by Tamil people, it is harder to list all in one single article, the list shows a few proverbs.

References

Proverbs by language
Tamil